Amiga Action was a monthly magazine about Amiga video games. It was published in the United Kingdom by Europress (later IDG Media) and ran for 89 full issues, from October 1989 to December 1996. After its closure, it was merged into sister publication Amiga Computing, replacing its games section. This ran for 10 issues until September 1997 when that magazine also folded.

References

External links

Archived Amiga Action magazines on the Internet Archive
Digitized Amiga Action magazines and Retro CDN

Amiga magazines
Defunct computer magazines published in the United Kingdom
Magazines established in 1989
Magazines disestablished in 1996
Mass media in West Sussex
Monthly magazines published in the United Kingdom
Video game magazines published in the United Kingdom